Charidimos Michos (born 15 March 1981) is a Greek professional football defender, currently playing for Anagennisi Karditsa. He has also played for Patraikos, Panegialios, Panachaiki, Ergotelis, Asteras Tripolis, Thrasyvoulos (for which he made 70 appearances) and Kerkyra.

References

External links
 Onsports.gr profile 
 

1981 births
Living people
Patraikos F.C. players
Panegialios F.C. players
A.O. Kerkyra players
Thrasyvoulos F.C. players
Ergotelis F.C. players
Asteras Tripolis F.C. players
Panachaiki F.C. players
Iraklis Thessaloniki F.C. players
Super League Greece players
Greek footballers
Association football fullbacks
Footballers from Drama, Greece